The Wolf of Wall Street is a 1929 American pre-Code drama film directed by Rowland V. Lee and starring George Bancroft, Paul Lukas, Olga Baclanova, and Nancy Carroll. The story and screenplay were written by Doris Anderson.

Originally made as a silent film, The Wolf of Wall Street was completely re-filmed with sound, becoming Bancroft's first talkie.

The plot concerns a ruthless trader (Bancroft) who corners the market in copper and then sells short, making a fortune but ultimately ruining the finances of himself and his friends.

Cast
 George Bancroft as The Wolf
 Olga Baclanova as Olga
 Nancy Carroll as Gert (the maid)
 Paul Lukas as David Tyler
 Brandon Hurst as Sturgess
 Crauford Kent as Jessup

Reception
Reception for the film was mixed. Life criticized the film for depending too much on its novelty value; the advertising ran "George Bancroft talks ... Baclanova sings", and Life noted "there is the good news that George Bancroft has a fine screen voice", but felt the film lacked substance in the plot. Film Daily wrote that "George Bancroft as the roughneck engineering a pool in Wall Street to get the sucker is immense, as usual", but complained of a lack of action and weak story.

References

External links
 

1929 drama films
1929 films
American drama films
American black-and-white films
1920s English-language films
Films directed by Rowland V. Lee
Wall Street films
Films scored by Karl Hajos
1920s American films